Cass City Public Schools is a public school district headquartered in Cass City, Michigan that serves approximately 1,060 students. The district's schools include Cass City Elementary School and Cass City Jr./Sr. High School.

History
Public education in Cass City dates back to at least 1864 with the construction of the first school house in the village. The current high school, Cass City Jr./Sr. High School, has served grades 9 to 12 since its construction in 1967, and grades 7 to 8 since 1997.

References

External links
 

School districts in Michigan
Educational institutions established in 1864
Education in Tuscola County, Michigan
1864 establishments in Michigan